Ludicorp was a company, based in Vancouver, British Columbia, Canada, that created Flickr and Game Neverending. It was founded in 2002 by Stewart Butterfield, Caterina Fake and Jason Classon and was bought by Yahoo! on March 20, 2005.

Ludicorp's structure

Team 
Their team consisted of:

Stewart Butterfield, President
Jason Classon, Operations Lead
Eric Costello, Client Development Lead
Caterina Fake, VP Marketing and Community
Craig Johannsen, Server Development Lead
Cal Henderson, Web Development Lead
Paul Lloyd, Developer
George Oates, Producer
Ben Cerveny, Game Designer and Advisor

Advisory board 
Cory Doctorow
Andrew Zolli
Clay Shirky

Founding

Background 
Stewart Butterfield, one founder of Ludicorp earned a bachelor's degree in philosophy in 1996 from the University of Victoria. and then went on to earn a master's degree in philosophy from the University of Cambridge shortly after. He also earned a master's degree in history from the University of Cambridge. Butterfield says his choice in degree, although uncommon for a STEM CEO, has benefited him in management and running businesses. Following this, he became a part of Jason Classon's start up business Gradfinder.com, which they would end up selling.

Caterina Fake and Stewart Butterfield met as web designers living in San Francisco and Vancouver respectively when they met. Fake moved to Vancouver and the two got married, starting Ludicorp with Classon, just after their honeymoon. Fake says that the inspiration for the name Ludicorp came from the Latin word ludus, meaning play, as they are working on an online game, Game Neverending.

Early operations 
Shortly following Ludicorp's founding, Butterfield, Classon and Fake began working on Game Neverending. According to Fake “[She] did the game design, Stewart did the interaction design and Jason did the PHP for the prototype.”  During the time they were developing Game Neverending, Ludicorp were able to secure a government loan and began to break even shortly later. Fake expressed how raising funds for Flickr however was difficult as it was a new concept, including many new features in the new social media market.

Development of Game Neverending 
According to Fake, “Neopets was one of the inspirations for Game Neverending,” a game where online multiplayer interaction was available. It was meant to be a game that would not end, and there was no concept of winning or losing in it. Game Neverending was finished and released in 2002, however it did not gain the success Ludicorp had wanted it to. Game Neverending eventually became Ludicorp's major project, Flickr.

Fake said that many in Ludicorp were disappointed to forgo Game Neverending, but they also realised that Flickr was a rising source of success for them.

Development of Flickr 
Game Neverending contained a feature which would allow players to communicate and share photographs with each other. However, all the technical features used to create this function were also the fundamental features of Flickr. After Game neverending became a financial failure, the Ludicorp executives then decided to drop that project and pursue Flickr, especially as it was beginning to gain financial success in 2004.

Flickr's first version was built in 8 weeks, as Ludicorp already had the necessary technology and software from Game Neverending. It was essentially a social networking site, allowing users to post and share pictures they had taken, without any help from professional companies. Its fast growth was pushed by the increasing popularity of social networking sites, such as YouTube and the increasing availability of smartphones with built in cameras.

Although many users were professional photographers, Flickr was aimed at those who found photography as a hobby. According to Fake, herself and Butterfield were both bloggers in their spare time and this was beneficial for them when creating the site. Ludicorp created Flickr in a way that it filled a hole in the market; other competitors did not allow bloggers to post pictures. Ludicorp also added many first ever features in Flickr, such as “authing in,” being able to change the amount of information you share with your friends and activity streams.

Ludicorp also designed Flickr to be more focused on content, rather than as a social interaction site, unlike a platform such as Facebook. Users can follow other users in a non-mutual subscription model, like YouTube. Furthermore, content can be viewed without the subscription, another first for social media sites in 2004. Fake said that they allowed this as at the time publicly viewable content was not a feature on other social media platforms.

According to Fake, Flickr “turned the tide for Ludicorp,” as with the failure of Game Neverending, the company was struggling. By the end of 2004 Flickr was worth approximately US$25 million. This led to many companies having interest in acquiring Ludicorp, one such company being Yahoo!.

Acquisition by Yahoo! 
At the end of 2004, Butterfield, Fake and Classon sold Ludicorp to Yahoo!. However, Butterfield also has admitted to selling the company too early, as many fans and users of twitter considered Yahoo! to be a poor owner. Following the acquisition, Fake and Classon left, with Butterfield following two years later in 2007 after having his second child and divorcing from Fake. In a memoir he sent to Brad Garlinghouse, announcing his resignation he said he felt “sidelined” by Yahoo! and did not have as much of a say in his company anymore.

In the years that Yahoo! owned Ludicorp, its main product Flickr peaked and then began to decline, with other social media networks taking over, such as Instagram and Snapchat. Furthermore, as Yahoo! did not focus on the development of Flickr it became difficult to monetize becoming unprofitable for Ludicorp and Yahoo!. Realising this, Yahoo! sold Flickr to SmugMug, causing Ludicorp to lose its main product. Although Ludicorp no longer owns Flickr as Yahoo! sold the product, not the company.

References

External links

Canadian companies established in 2002
Software companies established in 2002
2002 establishments in British Columbia
Software companies of Canada
Yahoo! acquisitions
Companies based in Vancouver
2005 mergers and acquisitions